Scolytomimus rectus, is a species of weevil found in Sri Lanka. Larval host plant is Osbeckia.

References 

Curculionidae
Insects of Sri Lanka
Beetles described in 1988